Bystričany is a village and municipality in Prievidza District in the Trenčín Region of western Slovakia.

History
In historical records the village was first mentioned in 1388.

Geography
The municipality lies at an altitude of 260 metres and covers an area of 37.607 km2. It has a population of about 1840 people.

Genealogical resources

The records for genealogical research are available at the state archive "Statny Archiv in Nitra, Slovakia"

 Roman Catholic church records (births/marriages/deaths): 1688-1939 (parish A)

See also
 List of municipalities and towns in Slovakia

References

External links

 
https://groups.google.com/group/bystricany Google Groups
https://web.archive.org/web/20071217080336/http://www.statistics.sk/mosmis/eng/run.html Statistics
Surnames of living people in Bystricany

Villages and municipalities in Prievidza District